Leland Historic District may refer to:

Leland Historic District (Leland, Michigan)
Leland Historic District (Leland, Mississippi)